Anameromorpha is a genus of longhorn beetles of the subfamily Lamiinae, containing the following species:

 Anameromorpha metallica Pic, 1923
 Anameromorpha pollinosa Holzschuh, 2009
 Anameromorpha unicolor Pic, 1923

References

Lamiini